The Toblerone line is a 10 km long defensive line made of "dragon's teeth" fortifications built during the Second World War between Bassins and Prangins, in the Canton of Vaud, Switzerland. These lines of defensive blocks can be found all over Switzerland, though more commonly in border areas. Their purpose was to stop tank invasions. The 2,700 9-ton concrete blocks that make up the defences are similar to the shape of the Toblerone chocolate bar, which gave its name to the line. Since the line has been left to nature since its construction, it was decided to keep these concrete blocks and to make a hiking trail along their route.

The line was built along twelve fortresses, the most well known being the "Villa Rose" in Gland, which was transformed into a museum and opened to the public in 2006.

History 
The Toblerone line is a part of the Promenthouse defence line, which more or less follows the watercourse of the brooklets Promenthouse and Serine. First reconnaissance took place in 1936, in 1937 construction began by ramming railway tracks into the ground in order to reinforce the banks of the watercourse. In autumn 1939, first contracts for the construction of bunkers were made.The position was constantly upgraded throughout the war and eventually comprised a virtually continuous line of tank blocks.

See also
Switzerland during the World Wars

References

External links

The Toblerone Trail

Military history of Switzerland
Buildings and structures in the canton of Vaud
World War II defensive lines
Fortifications of Switzerland built in the 20th century
Tourist attractions in the canton of Vaud
Anti-tank obstacles
20th-century architecture in Switzerland